Freida High Wasikhongo Tesfagiorgis (born October 21, 1946) is a painter, art historian, and visual culturalist who focuses on African American, modern and contemporary African art, African Diaspora, and modern European Art and Primitivism. She is Professor Emerita, Departments of African-American Studies, Gender & Women’s Studies, and Art, University of Wisconsin-Madison. In 2021 she was the recipient of a Lifetime Achievement Award at the 31st Annual James A. Porter Colloquium on African American Art at Howard University.

Education 
Tesfagiorgis received her A.A. from Graceland College, Lamoni, Iowa, her B.S. from Northern Illinois University, DeKalb, Illinois, her  M.A. and M.F.A. from University of Wisconsin-Madison, and her Ph.D. from University of Chicago.

Publications 

 Tesfagiorgis, Freida High W.. 1987. “Afrofemcentrism in the Art of Elizabeth Catlett and Faith Ringgold.” Sage; Atlanta, Ga. 4 (1).
 Tesfagiorgis, Freida High W. 1993. “In Search of a Discourse and Critique/s That Center the Art of Black Women Artists.” Included in:
 1993. Theorizing Black Feminisms: The Visionary Pragmatism of Black Women, edited by  Stanlie M. James and Abena P. A. Busia. London ; New York: Routledge.
 1997. Gendered Visions: The Art of Contemporary Africana Women Artists, edited by Herbert F. Johnson Museum of Art and Salah M. Hassan. Trenton, NJ: Africa World Press.
 2001. Black Feminist Cultural Criticism. Keyworks in Cultural Studies, edited by Jacqueline Bobo. 3. Malden, Mass: Blackwell.
 2015. Feminism-Art-Theory: An Anthology 1968-2014, edited by Hilary Robinson. Second Edition. Malden, MA: Wiley Blackwell.
 High, Freida. 1999. “An Interwoven Framework of Art History and Black Feminism: Framing Nigeria.” In Contemporary Textures: Multidimensionality in Nigerian Art, edited by Nikru Nzegwu. Binghamton, N.Y: International Society for the Study of Africa, Binghamton University.

References

External links
 Official website at University of Wisconsin—Madison
 Artifacts Feature: Freida High Wasikhongo Tesfagiorgis

1946 births
Living people
20th-century American women artists
21st-century American women artists
Graceland University alumni
Northern Illinois University alumni
University of Wisconsin–Madison alumni
University of Chicago alumni
University of Wisconsin–Madison faculty
American art historians
Women art historians
American women academics